Darfur (previously called Janjaweed) is a 2009 American film directed by Uwe Boll concerning the current conflict in Darfur, starring David O'Hara, Kristanna Loken, Billy Zane and Edward Furlong. The film was also released as Attack On Darfur.

Plot 
The plot of Darfur revolves around six Western journalists who visit a small village in Darfur in western Sudan under the escort of a squad of soldiers of the African Union (AU) peacekeeping mission. When they learn the brutal state sponsored militia called the Janjaweed are heading towards the village, they are faced with an impossible decision: leave Sudan and report the atrocities to the world, or risk their own lives and stay in the hopes of averting a certain slaughter.

While most of them flee back to their base, two of the journalists, Freddie Smith, and Theo Schwartz, decide to stay behind along with the Nigerian Army commander of the AU unit, Captain Jack Tobamke, to try to save the villagers when the Arab Janjaweed enter the village and begin to indiscriminately kill all the Black African men, women, and children. Despite their efforts to save some villagers, Captain Tobamke, Theo, and Freddie are all killed one by one in the subsequent shootout with the Janjaweed, but not before killing or wounding a few dozen of the savage militia. The surviving Janjaweed then burn the village to the ground and move on, presumably to continue their genocide rampage across the Darfur landscape.

The final scene shows the female member of the journalist team, Malin Lausberg, who had fled with most of the other reporters and AU soldiers during the Janjaweed attack, now return to the destroyed village the next day with a group of AU soldiers only to find everyone dead, including two of her colleagues. But she finds an infant that Freddie protected by hiding under Theo's dead body as the sole survivor of the massacre. Malin takes the baby with her as she and the rest of the AU troops leave the destroyed village behind.

Cast
 David O'Hara as  Freddie Smith
 Kristanna Loken as  Malin Lausberg
 Billy Zane as Bob Jones
 Edward Furlong as Adrian Archer
 Noah Danby as Theo Schwartz
 Matt Frewer as Ted Duncan
 Hakeem Kae-Kazim as  Captain Jack Tobamke
 Sammy Sheik as Janjaweed Commander

Development 
Darfur was filmed outside of Cape Town, South Africa in February and March 2009. Boll himself describes the film as "something that's very shocking". Much of the dialogue is improvised by the actors and the film is shot mostly with handheld cameras to convey a sense of realism, similar to Boll's previous films Stoic and 1968 Tunnel Rats.

Reception
In September 2010 Darfur won the New York International Independent Film and Video Festival prize for the best international film.

Human rights activist John Prendergast and Amnesty International were both reported to be impressed with the film.

References

External links 
 
 

2009 films
2000s war drama films
English-language Canadian films
War in Darfur
2000s English-language films
Films directed by Uwe Boll
Films set in Sudan
Films shot in South Africa
Canadian war drama films
2009 drama films
2000s Canadian films